The Harley-Davidson RR250, also known as the Harley-Davidson 250RR, was a racing motorcycle, designed, developed and built by Harley-Davidson, conforming to the 250cc class regulations of the Grand Prix motorcycle racing world championship, between 1972 and 1977.

References

RR250
Grand Prix motorcycles
Motorcycles introduced in 1972